The boys' individual ski mountaineering competition at the 2020 Winter Youth Olympics was held on 10 January at the Villars Winter Park. The race was contested over 2 laps on a 3.6 km course, making the total distance 7.2 km.

Results 
The race was started at 12:30.

References

Boys' individual